Migidae, also known as tree trapdoor spiders, is a family of spiders with about 100 species in eleven genera. They are small to large spiders with little to no hair and build burrows with a trapdoor. Some species live in tree fern stems. They have a Gondwanan distribution, found almost exclusively on the Southern Hemisphere, occurring in South America, Africa, Madagascar, Australia, New Zealand and New Caledonia.

Genera

, the World Spider Catalog accepts the following genera:

Bertmainius Harvey, Main, Rix & Cooper, 2015 — Australia
Calathotarsus Simon, 1903 — Chile, Argentina
Goloboffia Griswold & Ledford, 2001 — Chile
Heteromigas Hogg, 1902 — Australia
Mallecomigas Goloboff & Platnick, 1987 — Chile
Micromesomma Pocock, 1895 — Madagascar
Migas L. Koch, 1873 — New Zealand, Australia
Moggridgea O. Pickard-Cambridge, 1875 — Africa, Australia, Yemen
Paramigas Pocock, 1895 — Madagascar
Poecilomigas Simon, 1903 — South Africa, Tanzania
Thyropoeus Pocock, 1895 — Madagascar

References

 Zapfe, H. (1961). La Familia Migidae en Chile. Invest. Zool. Chil. 7: 151-157

External links
 Migidae
 

 
Mygalomorphae families